EN World, also known as Morrus' Unofficial Tabletop RPG News, is a British-owned tabletop role-playing game news and reviews website founded in 2000, which grew from the earlier "Eric Noah's Unofficial D&D 3rd Edition News" site (which was active from 1999-2001).

Description 
The main focus of EN World is on tabletop role-playing games news, initially Dungeons & Dragons, but since 2004 the website has covered the whole tabletop RPG hobby. The website is run and owned by Russ Morrissey, more commonly known as Morrus.

EN World is an online news source that covers the tabletop role-playing game hobby. It is recognized for reporting current news and product rumors, as well as providing insight into major product releases before they are officially unveiled.

In 1999, EN World established one of the earliest online tabletop RPG communities in the world. The site's forums continue to be a gathering place for over a quarter-million gamers, who discuss tabletop RPGs in-depth, including popular games like Dungeons & Dragons and Pathfinder. Members also participate in play-by-post games on the EN World message boards.

In 2005, the EN World GameStore was launched as a platform for selling downloadable RPG products. The GameStore allowed sellers to use their profits to purchase other products or transfer the money to PayPal. Buyers could transfer funds from PayPal or a similar service to purchase any non-free product. However, the GameStore was sold to DriveThruRPG in 2006.

EN World began experimenting with media content in 2012, starting with a six-episode animated show 'The Perturbed Dragon', video coverage of DragonMeet and the Battle of the Bards music competition.

In 2018, the site launched its official podcast, "Morrus' Unofficial Tabletop RPG Talk," a weekly program that provides insight into tabletop role-playing game news.

ENnies 
Every year in association with the Gen Con gaming convention, founded by Russ Morrissey in 2002, EN World has hosted the ENnies - an award show recognizing the best role-playing game products and publishers for the preceding year.  The first ENnies were held online in 2001, and the following year they were officially announced at Gen Con.  The ENnies were officially known as the "Gen Con EN World RPG Awards" from 2002-2019, for all tabletop role-playing game products, and as of 2017 are run by Business Manager, Stacey Muth. In 2019, EN World owner Russ Morrissey retired from the ENnies, which were officially renamed "The ENnies".

EN Publishing 
EN Publishing (originally called Natural 20 Press) was established in 2001 and is the publishing arm of EN World. It has published over 300 books, including the What's O.L.D. is N.E.W. (WOIN) role-playing game system, as well as its popular EN5ider magazine, and the official Judge Dredd (role-playing game). In 2016 Angus Abranson joined EN Publishing as business director. Abranson left in 2019 and was replaced by Jessica Hancock, while Marc Langworthy joined as 2000 AD line manager.

In August 2020 EN Publishing announced a project code-named Level Up, an advanced take on Dungeons & Dragons 5th Edition. In October of the same year, the company announced the Awfully Cheerful Engine, a comic-book-inspired tabletop game.

History 
Eric Noah's Unofficial D&D 3rd Edition News was the primary source of information about the third edition of the Dungeons & Dragons role-playing game before its release by Wizards of the Coast. The site gathered rumors and released information about the game, and many members were playing a hybrid game using the rules from this site along with the existing second-edition rules.

In 2001, Eric Noah announced that he was closing the website for personal reasons. A diaspora of other d20 news sites sprung into action at that time to replace it, of which EN World was the best known and most used. EN World was originally created as a sub-forum on Eric Noah's Unofficial D&D 3rd Edition News to support a community project that had originally been launched on Eric Noah's site to design a campaign world for 3rd Edition Dungeons & Dragons. It quickly developed into a news website covering d20 System products, while Eric Noah's Unofficial D&D 3rd Edition News focused on official D&D news. When Eric Noah's site closed, EN World took on the site's D&D news role.

See also

References

External links 
 EN World
Eric Noah's Unofficial D&D 3rd Edition News (archive)

Role-playing game websites